NGC 2090 is a spiral galaxy located approximately 40 million light-years from the Solar System in the Columba constellation. It was discovered on 29 October 1826 by Scottish astronomer James Dunlop. NGC 2090 was studied to refine the Hubble constant to an accuracy within ±10%.

See also 
 List of NGC objects (2001–3000)

Gallery

References

External links 

 
 SEDS

2090
Columba (constellation)
Unbarred spiral galaxies
Discoveries by James Dunlop
017819